Images is an album by American saxophonist Sonny Red, featuring tracks recorded in 1961 with Barry Harris, and Blue Mitchell or Grant Green, which was released on the Jazzland label.

Reception

Allmusic awarded the album 3 stars stating "The leader, Sonny Red Kyner (alto), never really became the individual strong player that his playing hinted he might develop into. Basically he was in the Charlie Parker-Jackie McLean tradition, and the material here had that spirit, but little punch".

Track listing
All compositions by Sonny Red except as indicated
 "Images" - 6:25 
 "Blues for Donna" - 4:44   
 "Dodge City" - 5:16 
 "Bewitched, Bothered and Bewildered" (Lorenz Hart, Richard Rodgers) - 5:41  
 "Blue Sonny" - 8:29
 "The Rhythm Thing"

Recorded at Plaza Sound Studios in New York City on June 25 (tracks 1-3) and December 14 (tracks 4-6), 1961

Personnel
Sonny Red - alto saxophone
Blue Mitchell - trumpet (tracks 1-3) 
Grant Green - guitar (tracks 5-6)
Barry Harris - piano
George Tucker - bass
Jimmy Cobb (tracks 4-6), Lex Humphries (tracks 1-3) - drums

References

Jazzland Records (1960) albums
Sonny Red albums
1962 albums
Albums produced by Orrin Keepnews